Mathias Moritz (born 21 February 1988) is a German former professional footballer who played as a goalkeeper. He began his career with Karlsruher SC, and made his debut for the club in October 2012, in a 0–0 draw with SpVgg Unterhaching in the 3. Liga.

References

External links

Living people
1988 births
Footballers from Karlsruhe
Association football goalkeepers
German footballers
Karlsruher SC players
Karlsruher SC II players
3. Liga players